A province is the second largest administrative division in Bolivia, after a department. Each department is divided into provinces. There are 112 provinces.

The country's provinces are further divided into 337 municipalities which are administered by an alcalde and municipal council.

List of provinces

Beni Department

Chuquisaca Department

Cochabamba Department

La Paz Department

Oruro Department

Pando Department

Potosí Department

Santa Cruz Department

Tarija Department

See also 
 Departments of Bolivia
 Municipalities of Bolivia

Sources 
 Instituto Nacional de Estadística - Bolivia (Spanish)

 
Subdivisions of Bolivia
Bolivia, Provinces
Provinces, Bolivia
Bolivia geography-related lists